Wilhelm Blunk (12 December 1902 – 25 October 1975) was a German international footballer.

References

1902 births
1975 deaths
Association football goalkeepers
German footballers
Germany international footballers
VfR Neumünster players
Hamburger SV players